The aerospike engine is a type of rocket engine that maintains its aerodynamic efficiency across a wide range of altitudes. It belongs to the class of altitude compensating nozzle engines. Aerospike engines have been studied for several years and are the baseline engines for many single-stage-to-orbit (SSTO) designs and were also a strong contender for the Space Shuttle main engine. However, no such engine is in commercial production, although some large-scale aerospikes are in testing phases.

The terminology in the literature surrounding this subject is somewhat confusing—the term aerospike was originally used for a truncated plug nozzle with a very rough conical taper and some gas injection, forming an "air spike" to help make up for the absence of the plug tail. However, frequently, a full-length plug nozzle is now called an aerospike.

Principles
The purpose of any engine bell is to direct the exhaust of a rocket engine in one direction, generating thrust in the opposite direction. The exhaust, a high-temperature mix of gases, has an effectively random momentum distribution (i.e., the exhaust pushes in any direction it can).  If the exhaust is allowed to escape in this form, only a small part of the flow will be moving in the correct direction and thus contribute to forward thrust.  The bell redirects exhaust moving in the wrong direction so that it generates thrust in the correct direction.  Ambient air pressure also imparts a small pressure against the exhaust, helping to keep it moving in the "right" direction as it exits the engine.  As the vehicle travels upward through the atmosphere, ambient air pressure is reduced.  This causes the thrust-generating exhaust to begin to expand outside the edge of the bell.  Since this exhaust begins traveling in the "wrong" direction (i.e., outward from the main exhaust plume), the efficiency of the engine is reduced as the rocket travels because this escaping exhaust is no longer contributing to the thrust of the engine.  An aerospike rocket engine seeks to eliminate this loss of efficiency.

Instead of firing the exhaust out of a small hole in the middle of a bell, an aerospike engine avoids this random distribution by firing along the outside edge of a wedge-shaped protrusion, the "spike", which serves the same function as a traditional engine bell. The spike forms one side of a "virtual" bell, with the other side being formed by the outside air.

The idea behind the aerospike design is that at low altitude the ambient pressure compresses the exhaust against the spike. Exhaust recirculation in the base zone of the spike can raise the pressure in that zone to nearly ambient. Since the pressure in front of the vehicle is ambient, this means that the exhaust at the base of the spike nearly balances out with the drag experienced by the vehicle.  It gives no overall thrust, but this part of the nozzle also doesn't lose thrust by forming a partial vacuum.  The thrust at the base part of the nozzle can be ignored at low altitude.

As the vehicle climbs to higher altitudes, the air pressure holding the exhaust against the spike decreases, as does the drag in front of the vehicle. The recirculation zone at the base of the spike maintains the pressure in that zone to a fraction of 1 bar, higher than the near-vacuum in front of the vehicle, thus giving extra thrust as altitude increases.  This effectively behaves like an "altitude compensator" in that the size of the bell automatically compensates as air pressure falls.

The disadvantages of aerospikes seem to be extra weight for the spike. Furthermore, the larger cooled area can reduce performance below theoretical levels by reducing the pressure against the nozzle. Aerospikes work relatively poorly between Mach 1–3, where the airflow around the vehicle has reduced the pressure, thus reducing the thrust.

Variations
Several versions of the design exist, differentiated by their shapes. In the toroidal aerospike the spike is bowl-shaped with the exhaust exiting in a ring around the outer rim. In theory this requires an infinitely long spike for best efficiency, but by blowing a small amount of gas out of the center of a shorter truncated spike (like base bleed in an artillery shell), something similar can be achieved.

In the linear aerospike the spike consists of a tapered wedge-shaped plate, with exhaust exiting on either side at the "thick" end. This design has the advantage of being stackable, allowing several smaller engines to be placed in a row to make one larger engine while augmenting steering performance with the use of individual engine throttle control.

Performance

Rocketdyne conducted a lengthy series of tests in the 1960s on various designs. Later models of these engines were based on their highly reliable J-2 engine machinery and provided the same sort of thrust levels as the conventional engines they were based on; 200,000 lbf (890 kN) in the J-2T-200k, and 250,000 lbf (1.1 MN) in the J-2T-250k (the T refers to the toroidal combustion chamber). Thirty years later their work was revived for use in NASA's X-33 project. In this case the slightly upgraded J-2S engine machinery was used with a linear spike, creating the XRS-2200. After more development and considerable testing, this project was cancelled when the X-33's composite fuel tanks repeatedly failed.
 

Three XRS-2200 engines were built during the X-33 program and underwent testing at NASA's Stennis Space Center. The single-engine tests were a success, but the program was halted before the testing for the two-engine setup could be completed. The XRS-2200 produces  thrust with an Isp of 339 seconds at sea level, and  thrust with an Isp of 436.5 seconds in a vacuum.

The RS-2200 Linear Aerospike Engine was derived from the XRS-2200. The RS-2200 was to power the VentureStar single-stage-to-orbit vehicle. In the latest design, seven RS-2200s producing  each would boost the VentureStar into low earth orbit. The development on the RS-2200 was formally halted in early 2001 when the X-33 program did not receive Space Launch Initiative funding. Lockheed Martin chose to not continue the VentureStar program without any funding support from NASA. An engine of this type is on outdoor display on the grounds of the NASA Marshall Space Flight Center in Huntsville Alabama.

The cancellation of the Lockheed Martin X-33 by the federal government in 2001 decreased funding availability, but aerospike engines remain an area of active research. For example, a milestone was achieved when a joint academic/industry team from California State University, Long Beach (CSULB) and Garvey Spacecraft Corporation successfully conducted a flight test of a liquid-propellant powered aerospike engine in the Mojave Desert on September 20, 2003. CSULB students had developed their Prospector 2 (P-2) rocket using a 1,000 lbf (4.4 kN) LOX/ethanol aerospike engine. This work on aerospike engines continues; Prospector-10, a ten-chamber aerospike engine, was test-fired June 25, 2008.

Further progress came in March 2004 when two successful tests sponsored by the NASA Dryden Flight Research Center using high-power rockets manufactured by Blacksky Corporation, based in Carlsbad, California. The aerospike nozzles and solid rocket motors were developed and built by the rocket motor division of Cesaroni Technology Incorporated, north of Toronto, Ontario. The two rockets were solid-fuel powered and fitted with non-truncated toroidal aerospike nozzles.

Small-scale aerospike engine development using a hybrid rocket propellant configuration has been ongoing by members of the Reaction Research Society.

In 2020 the TU Dresden and Fraunhofer IWS started their CFDμSAT-Project for research on additively manufactured aerospike-engines. A prototype has already been tested in a test cell at TU Dresden’s Institute of Aerospace Engineering, achieving a
burn time of 30 seconds.

Implementations

Firefly Aerospace 
In July 2014 Firefly Space Systems announced its planned Alpha launcher that uses an aerospike engine for its first stage. Intended for the small satellite launch market, it is designed to launch satellites into low-Earth orbit (LEO) at a price of US$8–9 million, much lower than with conventional launchers.

It uses carbon composite materials and uses the same basic design for both stages. The plug-cluster aerospike engine puts out  of thrust. The engine has a bell-shaped nozzle that has been cut in half, then stretched to form a ring with the half-nozzle now forming the profile of a plug.

This rocket design was never launched. The design was abandoned after Firefly Space Systems went bankrupt. A new company, Firefly Aerospace, has replaced the aerospike engine with a conventional engine in the Alpha 2.0 design. However, the company has proposed Firefly Gamma, a partially reusable spaceplane with aerospike engines.

ARCA Space 
In March 2017 ARCA Space Corporation announced their intention to build a single-stage-to-orbit rocket (SSTO), named Haas 2CA, using a linear aerospike engine. The rocket is designed to send up to 100 kg into low-Earth orbit, at a price of US$1 million per launch.

In June 2017, ARCA announced that they would fly their Demonstrator3 rocket to space, also using a linear aerospike engine. This rocket was designed to test several components of their Haas 2CA at lower cost. They announced a flight for August 2017.  In September 2017, ARCA announced that, after being delayed, their linear aerospike engine was ready to perform ground tests and flight tests on a Demonstrator3 rocket.

On December 20, 2019, ARCA tested the LAS 25DA aerospike steam rocket engine for the Launch Assist System.

KSF Space and Interstellar Space
Another spike engine concept model, by KSF Space and Interstellar Space in Los Angeles, was designed for orbital vehicle named SATORI. Due to lack of funding, the concept is still undeveloped.

Rocketstar 
Rocketstar planned to launch its 3D-printed aerospike rocket to an altitude of 50 miles in February 2019 but canceled the mission three days ahead of liftoff citing safety concerns. They are working on a second launch attempt.

Pangea Aerospace 
In November 2021, Spain-based Pangea Aerospace began hot-fire testing of its small-scale demonstration methane-oxygen aerospike engine DemoP1.

After successfully testing the demonstrator DemoP1, Pangea plans to up-scale to the 300kN ARCOS engine.

Stoke Space 
Headquartered in Kent, Washington, Stoke Space is building and testing a distributed architecture LH2/LOX aerospike system for its reusable second stage.

See also 
 Expanding nozzle
   
 
 
 Expansion deflection nozzle

References

External links

Aerospike Engine
Advanced Engines planned for uprated Saturn and Nova boosters — includes the J-2T
Linear Aerospike Engine — Propulsion for the X-33 Vehicle
Dryden Flight Research Center
Aerospike Engine Control System Features And Performance
X-33 Attitude Control Using The XRS-2200 Linear Aerospike Engine

 Are Aerospikes Better Than Bell Nozzles?

Rocket propulsion
Rocket engines
Industrial design